USS Pomander (SP-702) was a United States Navy patrol vessel in commission from 1917 to 1918.

Pomander was built in 1916 as a private motorboat of the same name by George Lawley & Son at Neponset, Massachusetts. On 29 May 1917, the U.S. Navy chartered her from Bertram B. Conrad of Wareham, Massachusetts, for use as a section patrol boat during World War I. She soon was commissioned as USS Pomander (SP-702).

Assigned to the 2nd Naval District in southern New England, Pomander carried out patrol duties for a time but eventually was deemed unfit for naval service and was returned to Lorenzo E. Anderson and Breckinridge Jones on 5 July 1918.

Notes

References

Department of the Navy Naval History and Heritage Command Online Library of Selected Images: U.S. Navy Ships: USS Pomander (SP-702), 1917-1918. Originally the civilian motor boat Pomander (1916)
NavSource Online: Section Patrol Craft Photo Archive Pomander (SP 702)

Patrol vessels of the United States Navy
World War I patrol vessels of the United States
Ships built in Boston
1917 ships